Phoxinus colchicus is a species of minnow that was described in 1910.It is found in southern tributaries of lower Kuban River of Russia and  Georgia.

References

colchicus
Taxa named by Lev Berg
Fish described in 1910